The Ralte/Galte tribe are a Sub-tribe of Zo people/Chin-Kuki-Mizo people mostly found scattered in the northern part of today's Aizawl Kolasib and Serchhip Mamit,Lunglei District and all over Mizoram. Tahan (Myanmar) Bangladesh,Tripura,Assam and Manipur India. The total population of Ralte tribe is around 500,000+ various towns and villages in Mizoram and Myanmar. Ralte pauTawng (Ralte language) is used by only around 2000-5000 people nowadays.

Mizo clans
Scheduled Tribes of Manipur